State Highway 89 (Andhra Pradesh) is a state highway in the Indian state of Andhra Pradesh

Route 

It starts at Macherla and passes through Durgi, Karempudi, Ipur and ends at Vinukonda.

See also 
 List of State Highways in Andhra Pradesh

References 

State Highways in Andhra Pradesh
Roads in Guntur district